Shelley A. Kloba (née Regan, born 1966 or 1967) is an American politician of the Democratic Party. She is a member of the Washington House of Representatives, representing the 1st district. She served on the Kirkland City Council from 2013 to 2016.

References

Women state legislators in Washington (state)
Washington (state) city council members
Democratic Party members of the Washington House of Representatives
Living people
21st-century American politicians
People from Kirkland, Washington
University of Illinois alumni
Year of birth missing (living people)
Women city councillors in Washington (state)
21st-century American women politicians